Adambrae is a residential area and small river (burn) in Livingston, consisting primarily of privately owned housing. There is a small nature area and pond adjacent to Bluebell Glade in Adambrae where the "Adambrae burn" runs through the area. This area is home to various waterfowl.

History
The residential area of Adambrae is a relatively new area, construction starting in late 1998. However, the name Adambrae was that of a farm further down the burn's course under Livingston centre. The farm was located just beside the site of the present-day Boulevard public house. This can be seen on early revisions of Ordnance Survey maps of Edinburghshire (now Mid Lothian). In the Land Registry, properties in Adambrae are classified as West Lothian as the Land Registry still uses the pre-war local authority boundaries. The historical Adambrae farm also had a Paper mill that was in production in the early 19th century. Adambrae mill was said to have been established in 1730 by a Mr Mitchell of nearby Alderstone.

The residential area of Adambrae was originally named Adambrae Parks and was just two streets, Heatherfield Glade and Sundew Glade, but has grown over the years. All the streets in Adambrae have "Glade" in their name.

Geography
Adambrae is located south-west of Livingston Town Centre and is bordered to the south by the A71 - village of Bellsquarry: to the east by Alderstone Road - Dedridge: to the west Wilderness woods which provide an area for walks and biking: and to the north Charlesfield Road Kirkton. Adambrae is the only area of Livingston to not have any through roads. Adambrae is one mile walk from the retail facilities of Livingston town centre. The mill was

Community facilities
Adambrae is one of two cemeteries located in Livingston but is the only one currently open for public burial. The cemetery was opened in June 1990 and is managed by West Lothian Council. In 2014, the cemetery was in the news when it was revealed that the body of a man had been buried in the wrong plot and this was unnoticed for 15 months. In March 2021, the cemetery was heavy vandalised with 20 headstones damaged.

There is a children's play area located in Adambrae.

There is no primary school within Adambrae. The local catchment for primary schools are Bankton Primary School and St Ninians RC Primary School, which are located in the Dedridge area of Livingston.

The local high schools are St. Margaret's Academy and James Young High School, which are a 30-minute walk and a 10-minute walk, respectively.

The area has a residents association.

References 

Livingston, West Lothian
Populated places in West Lothian